Short form cricket is a collective term for several modified forms of the sport of cricket, with playing times significantly shorter than more traditional forms of the game.

A typical short form cricket match can be completed within two to three hours, compared to 7–8 hours for a one-day cricket match, or five days for a Test match. They generally are limited overs cricket matches, with each team batting for a maximum of 5 to 20 overs (30 to 120 legal balls) depending on the format.

These short forms of cricket have been developed locally by various authorities, to fill a perceived marketing vacancy for a form of the sport which can be completed in a few hours, rather than a full day. They tend to emphasise the more "exciting" aspects of cricket as seen by more casual observers of the game, which includes aggressive batting and fast run scoring. In this regard they are successful, as shortened forms of cricket attract crowds of spectators who might not otherwise attend a cricket match.

Twenty20 Cricket

Although twenty over cricket matches have existed for decades and remains the most popular amateur form of the game, the professional format Twenty20 cricket was introduced by the England and Wales Cricket Board (ECB) in 2003. It is a form of one-day cricket in which each team bats for a maximum of only 20 overs, contrasting with 50 overs for a standard one-day match. This means a game can be completed in about three hours, making it more palatable for children and families than longer matches. The players can also rest.

The English first-class counties participate in a Twenty20 Cup competition annually. Many games are played in twilight, again to enhance family spectator appeal. They also feature numerous musical 'stings' for exciting events, such as the dismissal of a batsman, or the hitting of a boundary. Such fours and sixes are made easier to achieve by the shortening of the boundaries.

Major changes from the Laws of Cricket include:
 Should a bowler deliver a no-ball by overstepping the crease, his next delivery is designated a free-hit, from which the batsman can only be dismissed through a run-out, as is the case for the original no-ball.
 Bowlers may bowl a maximum of only 4 overs per innings, as is standard for 20-over cricket.
 Umpires may award 5-run penalties at their discretion if they believe either team is wasting time.

So far, Twenty20 has proved very popular with the public. On 15 July 2004, Middlesex vs. Surrey (the first Twenty20 game to be held at Lord's) attracted a crowd of 26,500, the largest attendance for any county game other than a one-day final since 1953.

On 5 August 2004, New Zealand Women defeated England Women in the first international Twenty20 match, played at Hove in England.

On 12 January 2005, Australia's first Twenty20 game was played at the WACA Ground between the Western Warriors and the Victorian Bushrangers. It drew a sellout crowd of 20,700 –  the largest seen at the ground for many years.

On 17 February 2005, Australia defeated New Zealand in the first men's international Twenty20 match, played at Eden Park in Auckland.

100-ball cricket

The 100 ball game was first proposed by the ECB in 2016, with the first club level games starting in England 2019. It was first played at professional level by a new city-based competition called The Hundred, with 8 teams from England and Wales, that started in 2021.

T10 cricket

Ten-overs per team cricket matches introduced by T10 Sports Management. The company started T10 League in UAE in 2017. In August 2018, the International Cricket Council (ICC) officially sanctioned the league.

In October 2019, Cricket West Indies decided to host women's exhibition T10 matches in the lead-up to the CPL 2019 final.

90-ball cricket 

Ninety–90 Bash, also known as the 90/90 is an upcoming annual franchise-based 90-balls cricket league in the United Arab Emirates, with each team facing 15 overs. The first edition of the tournament is planned to be held in 2022.

Evening cricket
Amateur evening cricket is a version of T20 cricket that is played informally throughout the UK and the world. The rules are similar to those of Twenty20 cricket, with some modifications designed to speed the game up and to ensure that the game cannot be dominated by a small group of skilled players.

As with orthodox 20-over cricket, each team faces 120 deliveries, however instead of being split into 20 six-ball overs, these are split into 15 eight-ball overs. This reduces the amount of time spent moving between overs and enables the same amount of cricket to be played in a shorter time.

In contrast to orthodox cricket rules, an extra ball is not awarded following a wide or no-ball, in order to save time. Instead, two runs are added to the score instead of the usual one run. This rule does not usually apply for the last over of each innings to ensure that no strategic advantage can be gained from the deliberate bowling of a wide ball.

The fielding side is limited to three overs per bowler, or in some formats only two overs. This ensures that the majority of each team is required to bowl. The tactical implications of this rule for the fielding team captain are important as he must carefully decide when to bowl his experienced and inexperienced bowlers.

Batsmen are required to retire upon reaching a pre-agreed personal score, usually 25 or 30. Should the side be dismissed with a number of batsmen retired, they may then return to the crease in the order they retired. It is not unprecedented for a batsman to retire for a second or even third time in one innings. This rule ensures that the majority of a team will get a bat, and hence ensures the emphasis on the entire team both getting involved and being able to contribute to the final score.

This informal format of cricket is extremely popular in the UK and is seen as the ideal way for new or inexperienced players to be introduced to the sport. More than any other format of cricket, the outcome of the game is often decided by the joint contributions of all the players rather than a few highly skilled performers. This makes it an extremely enjoyable format for amateur cricketers to play.

Six-a-side cricket

Six-a-side Cricket is a very short form of the sport designed to be played by teams of only six players. Each team receives one innings, with a maximum of only five overs. Naturally, with far fewer fielders, runs are much easier to score, and sixes matches are typically frenetic affairs. As the games last less than an hour, sixes cricket is typically played in a tournament format with multiple teams competing at the same ground.

Other major changes to the Laws of Cricket include:
 Each player on a side is permitted to bowl a maximum of one over.
 Wides and no-balls score two extra runs each.
 If five wickets fall, the last batsman bats on. The last batsman to get out remains on the field as a non-batting runner, and the batsmen swap ends whenever the runner ends up on strike.
 A batsman who reaches or passes a certain number runs, often 30 or 31, must retire "not out". If one of the last pair of batsmen is out, a retired batsman may come in and resume his innings.
 In some formats of the game, hitting a 'six' counts as 10 runs, and striking a 'four' counts as six runs.

Six-a-side cricket or the similar eight-a-side cricket is a popular tournament format used in the UK that came to international prominence with a high-profile tournament held in Hong Kong annually, involving some of the best players from each Test nation, as well as other countries. The entire tournament is run over two days.

Six A Side Cricket Federation of India
Six-A-Side-Cricket Federation of India was founded in 2002 hosting inter-school  and inter-university tournaments. Federation organized Sub Junior, Junior, Youth, Senior, Federation Cup, and Zonal tournaments.

Cricket Max

Cricket Max is a defunct form of cricket invented in New Zealand by former New Zealand cricketer and captain Martin Crowe which was played primarily by New Zealand first-class cricket teams in an annual competition. International matches were also played between the New Zealand Max Blacks and England (1997), West Indies (2000) and India (2002). It was essentially a very short form of test cricket, with each team permitted two innings, but a maximum of only 10 overs for each innings.

Other major changes from the Laws of Cricket include:
 Each side bats two innings of a maximum of 10 overs each.
 Batsmen may not be out from a no-ball as usual, and also the next ball bowled after a no-ball. This is intended to encourage aggressive batting on the "free hit" ball.
 Wides score 2 extras instead of 1.
 Bowlers may not bowl more than 4 overs per match. These may be distributed between the two innings in any way.
 The field is marked with trapezoidal "Max" zones, one at each end of the field, beginning 60 metres from the striker's wicket, where the trapezoid is 40 metres wide, and extending to the boundary, where the trapezoid is 50 metres wide. Any ball hit into the Max zone doubles the number of runs scored from that ball, whether by running between the wickets, or a boundary four or six. Fielders may not be in the Max zone as the ball is bowled. Only the Max zone in front of the striker is valid for all these rules.
 The first version of Cricket Max also included the use of 4 stumps, instead of 3, at each end of the cricket pitch. This was designed to help bowlers dismiss batsmen, as a batsman could not be dismissed leg before wicket.

Super 8s
Super 8s is a defunct short form of cricket devised by Greg Chappell for the Australian Cricket Board in 1996. The format was conceived as a way to financially reward the top-class domestic cricketers in Australia whose opportunities of making it into the significantly higher-paying Australian national side were limited. Matches were played outside the regular cricket season during the Australian winter at rugby stadiums with smaller rectangular fields such as Willows Sports Complex in Townsville. An international tournament was held in Kuala Lumpur, Malaysia in July 1996.

The changes from the usual Laws of Cricket include:
 Eight players per side
 14 over matches
 All players except the wicketkeeper must bowl a minimum of one over, but no more than three overs
 A boundary 6 is worth 8 runs
 Batsmen must retire at 50 runs, but are allowed to return if balls are left in innings
 Last batsmen allowed to continue to end of innings, even after 7 wickets have fallen

References